Dorian Cooke (25 December 1916 - 18 September 2005) was a poet, MI6 operative, and head of the Yugoslav section at the BBC.

References
 The Times obituary, 11 October 2005
 P. N. Review No. 168, March–April 2006

1916 births
2005 deaths
20th-century English poets